The Phantom of the Opera is the soundtrack to the 2004 film based on the Andrew Lloyd Webber musical, There are two versions released, the standard 14-track release and a two-disc deluxe edition.

Track listing
In addition to the listed tracks, versions of "The Phantom of the Opera" remixed by Junior Vasquez were made available to iTunes customers who purchased the expanded edition.

Normal release

Two disc deluxe edition

Personnel

Vocals: Gerard Butler, Emmy Rossum, Patrick Wilson

Studio Assistants: Aaron Fessel, Cesar Ramirez
Producer: Andrew Lloyd Webber
Casting: Chris Overton, Anne Skilbeck
Mixing: Anna Behlmer, Andy Nelson
Photography: Alex Bailey

Accomplishments and certifications
In 2006, The Phantom of the Opera won the RIAJ's Japan Gold Disc Award for "Best Soundtrack Album of the Year." Chart-wise, the album performed fairly well, reaching the top position of Billboard's soundtracks chart as well as the sixteenth position on the Top 200 chart. It was also certified Platinum in the US and Gold in the UK and Greece.

"Learn to Be Lonely" was written for the film by Andrew Lloyd Webber and Charles Hart, recycling the melody of the deleted song "No One Would Listen," sung by Gerard Butler. It was nominated for the Academy Award for Best Original Song at the 77th Academy Awards and the Golden Globe at the 62nd Golden Globe Awards.

Chart positions

Weekly charts

Year-end charts

Certifications

References

Musical film soundtracks
The Phantom of the Opera (1986 musical)
2004 soundtrack albums
Romance film soundtracks